Frank Woodward may refer to:
 Frank Woodward (baseball) (1894–1961), American baseball pitcher
 Frank Woodward (rugby league) (1885-1941), New Zealand rugby league footballer
 F. L. Woodward (Frank Lee Woodward, 1871–1952), English educationist

See also
 Francis Woodward (disambiguation)